Music in the Blood is a 1934 German drama film directed by Erich Waschneck and starring Leo Slezak, Hanna Waag and Sybille Schmitz. Location shooting took place in Dresden.

Cast
 Leo Slezak as Friedrich Hagedorn, Kapellmeister
 Elsa Wagner as Mathilde, seine Frau
 Hanna Waag as Hanna, seine Tochter
 Sybille Schmitz as Carola, seine Nichte
 Wolfgang Liebeneiner as Hans Peters
 Walter Ladengast as Franz Zahlinger, Korrepetitor
 Alexander Engel as Klinkermann, erster Geiger
 Hans Junkermann as Direktor Gregor
 Willy Kaiser-Heyl as Prof. Forster
 Ernst Behmer as Wittig, Diener
 Berliner Konzert-Verein as Orchestra
 Horst Birr
 Olga Engl
 Trude Haefelin
 Carl Walther Meyer
 Karl Platen
 Klaus Pohl
 Willi Schur
 Franz Stein
 Erika Streithorst
 Isa Vermehren
 Leopold von Ledebur
 Wolfgang von Schwindt
 Gertrud Wolle

References

Bibliography

External links 
 

1934 films
Films of Nazi Germany
German drama films
1934 drama films
1930s German-language films
Films directed by Erich Waschneck
Tobis Film films
German black-and-white films
1930s German films